The Downtown Fiction was an American rock band from Fairfax, Virginia. The band consisted of guitarist and lead vocalist Cameron Leahy, bassist and backing vocalist David Pavluk, guitarist and backing vocalist Wes Dimond, and drummer Kyle Rodgers.

Music career
Lead singer/guitarist/primary songwriter Cameron Leahy met former drummer Eric Jones at Westfield High School, where they became friends. They had a mutual interest in music, and formed The Downtown Fiction in the summer of 2008. They began to post demos on the band's MySpace page, where their fan base initialized. Needing a bassist, Cameron and Eric added David Pavluk to the band, who also is responsible for background vocals. "The Downtown Fiction" is inspired by the cult-classic film Pulp Fiction, a favorite of the band.

The Downtown Fiction toured for a year, and were soon signed to Photo Finish Records, an independent record label based in New York. They toured on the Bamboozle Road Show 2010 and the Warped Tour 2010. The band was featured that year in the "100 Bands You Need To Know" issue of Alternative Press. A self-titled EP by the band was released in March 2009, featuring a few of their rising hit songs, including "Is Anybody Out There?" and "Living Proof." This was succeeded by an additional EP a year later in March 2010, titled Best I Never Had. Later a compilation was released, The Double E.P., incorporating all of their preceding EP's tracks, and a rough demo of "Keep On Moving." In late February 2011, the band began The Glamour Kills Tour which featured The Ready Set as the headliner, along with Allstar Weekend, We Are The In Crowd, and briefly Marianas Trench.

In August 2010, the band premiered their first music video for the single "I Just Wanna Run," which has become RIAA Certification Gold, later appearing on their 2011 debut album Let's Be Animals.

In early April, the band's second single for their debut album premiered, titled "Thanks For Nothing". In late April 2011, Let's Be Animals, the band's first full-length studio album was released. The Downtown Fiction also embarked on their first headlining nationwide tour with the same album name. The Let's Be Animals Tour featured Amely, Cady Groves, and He Is We.

In Summer 2011, the band joined the Friday is Forever Tour with We the Kings, The Summer Set, Hot Chelle Rae, and Action Item. On September 15, 2011, the band announced on their website that drummer Eric Jones was leaving the band to work in the industry side of music and live guitarist Wes Dimond would become an official band member. Later in December, the band announced Kyle Rodgers would become their new drummer. The Downtown Fiction released their fourth EP, Pineapple EP, on December 20, 2011. On December 31, 2011, they opened for The Ready Set and The Romantics at the HOTFM 2011-2012 HOT New Year's Eve Party in Grand Rapids, Michigan.
 
On August 5, 2012, All Time Low announced their 'Rockshow at the End of the World' fall tour, with support from the Summer Set and The Downtown Fiction.

The Downtown Fiction announced in April 2012 they had begun working on their sophomore full-length effort in Los Angeles, CA. The band also toured South America in September 2012. In September 2013, the band signed with Fearless Records. The video for their single, "Some Place On Earth," debuted December 18, 2013 on VEVO, which appeared later on their new record, "Losers and Kings", which was released on June 17, 2014.

In the fall of 2014, The Downtown Fiction toured with fellow musicians Against the Current, The Ready Set, and Metro Station on "The Outsider's Tour." In the spring of 2015, the band accompanied Yellowcard & Finch on the Yellowcard 2015 Tour.

Recent
In late 2015, RIAA announced the band's single, "I Just Wanna Run" had received Gold RIAA certification.

On January 29, 2016, The Downtown Fiction released the lyric music video for "Let's Fade Away" on VEVO, the first single off their latest album, Alligator Tears—released February 26, 2016.

Billboard.com premiered the music video for the second single off Alligator Tears, "Hepburn Shades", on May 7, 2016, featuring actress Matilda Lutz and directed by Remii Huang.

Final lineup
 Cameron Leahy – lead vocals, guitar (2008–2016)
 David Pavluk – bass, backing vocals (2008–2016)
 Wes Dimond – lead guitar, backing vocals (2011–2016)
 Kyle Rodgers – drums (2011–2016)

Past members
 Devin Cooper – bass (2008)
 Alan Scarpa – rhythm guitar (2008-2010; touring member)
 Eric Jones – drums (2008-2011)

Appearances in media
They were featured in the "100 Bands You Need To Know" issue of Alternative Press.
"I Just Wanna Run" is on the Hopeless RecordsSub city compilation album, Take Action! Volume 9.
The band's cover of Nicki Minaj's "Super Bass" appeared on 2011's Punk Goes Pop 4.

Discography

The Downtown Fiction (EP) (2009) 
 Your Voice
 Is Anybody Out There
 Hold My Breath
 When You're Around
 No Typical Thursday Night
 Living Proof
 Living Proof (Acoustic Version)
 Forgot It Was Christmas
 Keep Moving (Rough Demo)

Best I Never Had (EP) (2010) 

 Best I Never Had
 Oceans Between Us
 I Just Wanna Run
 Take Me Home
 You Were Wrong
 Where Dreams Go to Die

The Double EP (2010) 

 Best I Never Had
 Oceans Between Us
 I Just Wanna Run
 Take Me Home
 You Were Wrong
 Where Dreams Go to Die
 Your Voice
 Is Anybody Out There
 Hold My Breath
 When You're Around
 No Typical Thursday Night
 Living Proof
 Living Proof (Acoustic Version)
 Forgot It Was Christmas
 Keep Moving (Rough Demo)

Let's Be Animals (2011) 

 Thanks For Nothing
 Freak
 Stoned
 I Just Wanna Run
 She Knows
 Let's Be Animals
 Wake Up
 Medicine For You (bonus track)
 Alibi
 Tell Me a Lie
 Losing My Mind (bonus track)
 Sierra (bonus track)
 A Wonderful Surprise
 Hurt Me So Good (bonus track)

Pineapple (EP) (2011) 

 Out in the Streets
 Get It Right
 Happy (Without You)
 Feeling Better
 Circles

Losers & Kings (2014) 

 Some Place on Earth
 Hope I Die on a Saturday Night
 Don't Count Me Out
 Kiss My Friends
 Santa Cruz
 No Generation
 Cool Kids
 So-Called Life
 Big Mistakes
 Right Where We Left Off
 Sometimes
 Know My Name (Japan bonus track)

Alligator Tears (EP) (2016) 

 Let's Fade Away
 Dream Within A Dream
 Van Gogh Colors
 Is This The End
 Hepburn Shades

References

External links
Official Myspace

American pop rock music groups
Photo Finish Records artists
Musical groups established in 2008
Musical groups from Virginia
People from Fairfax, Virginia
Fearless Records artists